Michael Strauss may refer to:

 Michael Strauss (fencer) (born 1929), British fencer
 Michael Strauss (industrialist) (1934–2020), Israeli industrialist

See also
 Michael W. Straus (1897–1970), commissioner of the United States Bureau of Reclamation